Giunio Fedreghini (1861–1948) was an Italian fencer. He competed in three events at the 1900 Summer Olympics.

References

External links
 

1861 births
1948 deaths
Italian male fencers
Olympic fencers of Italy
Fencers at the 1900 Summer Olympics
Sportspeople from the Province of Bergamo
Date of birth missing
Date of death missing
Place of death missing